The SLS South Beach is a historic hotel, known for many years as the Ritz Plaza Hotel, in the Miami Beach Architectural District in Miami Beach, Florida. The 12 floor/62 meter hotel was the tallest building in the city for 30 years until it was surpassed by 5660 Condominiums.

History
The Grossinger family expanded from their Catskill resort into Miami Beach in 1939. The Art Deco tower was designed by architect L. Murray Dixon and opened as the Grossinger Beach Hotel. It was the first air-conditioned hotel on Miami Beach.

The hotel was used by the U.S. Army during World War II to accommodate high-ranking officers. The property re-opened in 1946 as the Ritz Plaza.

In 1989, the hotel was purchased by Ignacio Contreras and Manuel Llerandi and restored to its Art Deco roots, reopening in February 1990. The hotel became a member of the National Trust for Historic Preservation's Historic Hotels of America in 1991. The Ritz Plaza was sold to developer Sam Nazarian in 2004 and closed for reconstruction as a luxury boutique hotel. The work took much longer than anticipated, and the hotel did not reopen until May 2012, as the SLS South Beach.

References

Hotel buildings completed in 1939
Art Deco hotels
Art Deco architecture in Florida
Skyscraper hotels in Miami Beach, Florida
1939 establishments in Florida